Klaus-Günter Stade (born 24 May 1953) is a German former professional footballer.

Stade made a total of 3 appearances in the Fußball-Bundesliga for Tennis Borussia Berlin during his playing career.

References 
 

1953 births
Living people
German footballers
Association football forwards
Bundesliga players
Tennis Borussia Berlin players